Prince Carol of Romania may refer to the following members of the Romanian royal family:

 Carol I of Romania (1839-1914)
 Carol II of Romania (1893-1953)
 Carol Lambrino, also known as Prince Mircea Grigore Carol of Romania (1920 - 2006)